Madventures may refer to:

 Madventures (Finnish TV program), a 2002 Finnish travel documentary television program
 Madventures (Pakistani game show), a 2013 Pakistani adaptation of the popular reality show Fear Factor